Multiple congenital anomalies-hypotonia-seizures syndrome is a rare multi-systemic genetic disorder which is characterized by developmental delay, seizures, hypotonia and heart, urinary, and gastrointestinal abnormalities.

Presentation 

People with this disorder often show the following symptoms:

General 

 Hypotonia
 Widespread developmental delays
 Early-onset seizures

Heart 

 Patent foramen ovale
 Atrial septal defect
 Patent ductus arteriosus

Genito-urinary 

 Hydrocele
 Renal collection system dilatation
 Hydroureter
 Hydronephrosis
 Trabecular urinary bladder hypertrophy

Gastrointestinal 

 Gastroesophageal reflux
 Anal stenosis
 Imperforate anus
 Ano-vestibular fistula

Facial 

 Coarse face
 Occiput prominence
 Bitemporal narrowing
 Epicanthal folds
 Hypertelorbitism
 Nystagmus
 Strabismus
 Distracted eyes
 Low-set prominent ears
 Nasal bridge depression
 Upward-facing nose
 Long philtrum
 Large, constantly open mouth
 Thin lips
 High palate
 Micro/retrognathia

Auricular 

 Auricle abnormalities

Causes 
It is caused by an autosomal recessive mutation in the PIGN gene, in chromosome 18, to be more specific; it is caused by a base pair substitution of C to A somewhere in the gene.

Epidemiology 

Only 15 cases of this syndrome have been reported in medical literature.

References 

  Medical genetics
Genetic diseases and disorders